Irvington is an unincorporated community located along U.S. Route 90, east of St. Elmo and north of Bayou La Batre in southwestern Mobile County, Alabama, United States. It has a post office utilizing the 36544 ZIP code and is home to the Mobile International Speedway and Silver King Golf Course.

History
Early in the 20th century, Irvington was a thriving farm community and the center of a lucrative Tung oil (Vernicia fordii) business.

Geography

Education
Mobile County Public School System operates Dixon Elementary School in the area.

See also
Mobile International Speedway

References

Unincorporated communities in Alabama
Unincorporated communities in Mobile County, Alabama